Prince Francis of Teck,  (Francis Joseph Leopold Frederick; 9 January 1870 – 22 October 1910) was the younger brother of the British queen Mary of Teck, wife of King George V.

Family

Francis Joseph Leopold Frederick, known as "Frank", was born at Kensington Palace and educated at Wellington College, Cheltenham College (Stone, 1912, p. xviii) and the Royal Military College, Sandhurst.

His father was Prince Francis, Duke of Teck, the son of Duke Alexander of Württemberg and Countess Claudine Rhédey von Kis-Rhéde (created the Countess von Hohenstein). His mother was the Duchess of Teck (née Princess Mary Adelaide of Cambridge), the youngest daughter of Prince Adolphus, Duke of Cambridge and a granddaughter of George III. Frank was thus styled "His Serene Highness Prince Francis of Teck".

Education
He was expelled from Wellington College, Berkshire "for throwing his housemaster over a hedge to win a bet. All through his life he was an incorrigible gambler. He then went to Cheltenham where he got into more trouble."

Personal life
Francis never married. According to Julia P. Gelardi's Born to Rule, Prince Francis was vigorously pursued by Maud of Wales, his sister's sister-in-law. The two exchanged letters, but it soon became clear that Francis was not interested in Maud. She went on to marry her first cousin Prince Carl of Denmark, becoming Queen of Norway in 1905.

Francis had an affair with society beauty Ellen Constance, wife of Francis Needham, 3rd Earl of Kilmorey, to whom he allegedly bequeathed the Cambridge emeralds, part of the Teck family jewels. To recover these family heirlooms, Francis's sister Queen Mary had his will sealed by a court, and subsequently negotiated with Lady Kilmorey to buy back the emeralds, reportedly paying her £10,000 for them.

The English actress Sarah Miles has claimed to be the great-granddaughter of Prince Francis, through her grandfather, allegedly an illegitimate son of the prince called Francis Remnant, born at Richmond, Surrey, in 1894.

Military career
He attended the Royal Military College, Sandhurst and served in the Lancers and the Royal Rifle Corps before joining the Royal Dragoons in 1890. He rose to the rank of Major, before retiring in 1902.

 1889.01.30 2nd Lieutenant, 9th (Queen's Royal) Lancers
 1889.04.17 transferred to 1st Bn, The King's Royal Rifle Corps
 1890.10.08 transferred to 1st Royal Dragoons
 1891.08.26 Lieutenant, 1st Royal Dragoons
 1894.07.25 Captain, 1st Royal Dragoons
 1896.11.25 Aide de Camp to the General Officer Commanding, Quetta, India
 1897.08.06 attached Egyptian Army
 1897–1898 served in Nile Expedition (Atbara and Khartoum) (rcvd: MID twice, DSO, Medal with clasp)
 1899.01.11 Aide de Camp to the General Officer Commanding, South Eastern District
 1899.07.24 Staff Captain, Remount Establishment, Dublin
 1899.05.29 DAAG, Remount Establishment, South Africa
 1899–1900 served in the South African War in Transvaal operations (rcvd: MID, brevet Major, Queen's Medal with 3 clasps)
 1900.11.29 Brevet Major
 1901.11.16 Major, 1st Dragoons
 1901.11.16 retired and transferred to Reserve of Officers
 1902.09.03 retired from the 1st Dragoons, receiving a gratuity

In 1902 he again visited South Africa, and following the end of hostilities returned to England in June that year on board the SS Kinfauns Castle.

Death and legacy
He died suddenly in 1910 at the age of forty, having caught pneumonia at Balmoral.

On his early death, shortly before his sister's coronation as queen of the United Kingdom, Francis of Teck's will set a legal precedent when it was sealed, to avoid potential scandal. The document remains unpublished, and subsequent royal wills have followed this tradition.

After being initially interred in the Royal Vault at St George's Chapel, Windsor Castle, he was buried in the Royal Burial Ground, Frogmore.

Orders and decorations
 : Knight Commander of the Royal Victorian Order, 8 December 1898; Knight Grand Cross, 1 December 1909

Ancestry

References

External links
BBC Radio 4 programme

1870 births
1910 deaths
People from Kensington
Francis
People educated at Wellington College, Berkshire
Graduates of the Royal Military College, Sandhurst
Companions of the Distinguished Service Order
Knights Grand Cross of the Royal Victorian Order
British Army personnel of the Second Boer War
British Army personnel of the Mahdist War
9th Queen's Royal Lancers officers
King's Royal Rifle Corps officers
1st The Royal Dragoons officers
Burials at the Royal Burial Ground, Frogmore
Royal reburials